Miss World Puerto Rico 2022, was the 47th edition of the Miss World Puerto Rico pageant. It was held at the Centro de Bellas Artes de Caguas in Caguas, Puerto Rico on June 30, 2022. Elena Rivera of Toa Baja was crowned Miss World Puerto Rico 2022 by outgoing titleholder Aryam Díaz Rosado of Naranjito. Rivera is set to represent Puerto Rico at Miss World 2022.

Results

Placements

Challenges

Beauty With a Purpose

Best Body

Head to Head Challenge

Sports

Talent

Top Model

Contestants 
Official 31 candidates of Miss World Puerto Rico 2022:

Crossovers
 Miss USA

 Miss World America

 Miss Teen USA
 2014:  Luquillo – Mariela Pepin Solis (as )

References

External links 

 
 Video of Miss World Puerto Rico 2022 contest (in Spanish)

2022 in Puerto Rico
2022
2022 beauty pageants
Miss Puerto Rico